River Valley Community College (RVCC) is a public community college with campuses in Claremont, Keene, and Lebanon, New Hampshire. It is part of the Community College System of New Hampshire and is accredited by the New England Commission of Higher Education. The college offers over 35 degree and certificate programs.

It was established as the New Hampshire Community Technical College at Claremont in 1968. The Keene Academic Center opened in 2004. The college's third location in Lebanon opened January 2016, in the former Lebanon College building.

References

External links

 Official website

Claremont, New Hampshire
Keene, New Hampshire
Lebanon, New Hampshire
Community colleges in New Hampshire
University System of New Hampshire
1968 establishments in New Hampshire
Educational institutions established in 1968